Palace Barracks, Holywood is a British Army installation in Holywood, County Down, Northern Ireland.

History
Palace Barracks occupies the site of a palatial house known as "Ardtullagh", the home of the Bishop of Down, Connor and Dromore until it was bought by the UK War Office in 1886.

In 1933, six children of Lance Corporal Harry Poole and his wife, Mary, lost their lives from asphyxiation following gas poisoning in the married quarters of the barracks.

During the roughly three decades of "The Troubles" in Northern Ireland, the barracks served as the home base for battalions rotating through the province, especially those on a two-year "accompanied" tour with their families. A wide variety of facilities are available for soldiers to use off duty, including a swimming pool, squash courts, saunas, bars and a gymnasium.

Palace Barracks became the Regimental Headquarters of the Royal Irish Regiment in 2008.

In March 2010, it was the site of a bombing. An elderly man was blown off his feet and had to be treated in hospital. The bomb was allegedly driven towards the base in a hijacked taxi. The Real IRA claimed responsibility for the attack.

In 2014, it became the base for the Royal Scots Borderers, 1st Battalion, The Royal Regiment of Scotland.

Current units
Current units stationed at the camp include:

British Army
1st Battalion, Ranger Regiment
Regimental Headquarters, 152 (North Irish) Regiment, Royal Logistic Corps
227 (Belfast) Headquarters Squadron
220 (Belfast) Tanker Squadron
400 Petroleum Operator Squadron
Regimental Headquarters, Royal Irish Regiment

Royal Navy
Belfast Detachment, Royal Marines Reserve Scotland

Security Service
Northern Ireland Headquarters

Palace Barracks is the declared headquarters of the MI5 for their investigations into Northern Ireland-related terrorism.

References

1886 establishments in Ireland
2010 in Northern Ireland
Car and truck bombings in Northern Ireland
Terrorism in Northern Ireland
Military of Northern Ireland
Barracks in Northern Ireland
Military history of County Down
Royal Irish Regiment (1992)
Installations of the British Army
Terrorist incidents in the United Kingdom in 2010
2010s crimes in Northern Ireland
2010 crimes in Ireland